Shidaisaurus is a genus of metriacanthosaurid dinosaur.  Its fossil was found in early Middle Jurassic-age rocks of the Chuanjie Formation in Yunnan, China. It is known from a partial skeleton, holotype DML-LCA 9701-IV, found at the bottom of an assemblage of nine dinosaur individuals, lacking most of the tail vertebrae, ribs, pectoral girdle, and limb bones. Shidaisaurus was described in 2009 by Wu and colleagues.  The type species is Shidaisaurus jinae. Generic name and specific name in combination refer to the Jin-Shidai ("Golden Age") Company that exploits the Jurassic World Park near the site.

In 2016 another estimation listed it higher at 7.1 meters (23.3 feet) long and 950 kilograms (2,094 lbs). It is the oldest Allosauroid known to date.

References

Metriacanthosaurids
Middle Jurassic dinosaurs of Asia
Fossil taxa described in 2009
Taxa named by Philip J. Currie
Paleontology in Yunnan